Juan Sebastián Gómez and Maciek Sykut were the defending champions but decided not to participate.
Juan Sebastián Cabal and Carlos Salamanca won the title, defeating Marcelo Demoliner and João Souza 7–6(9–7), 7–6(7–4) in the final.

Seeds

Draw

Draw

References
 Main Draw

Quito Challenger - Doubles
2012 Doubles